HD 57197, also known as M Puppis or HR 2789, is a suspected astrometric binary located in the southern constellation Puppis, the poop deck. It has an apparent magnitude of 5.84, making it faintly visible to the naked eye under ideal conditions. Based on parallax measurements from the Gaia satellite, the system is estimated to be 629 light years away from the Solar System. At its current distance, HD 57197's brightness is diminished by 0.3 magnitudes due to interstellar dust. It has an absolute magnitude of -0.43.

The visible component has a stellar classification of B8 II/III, indicating that it is an evolved B-type star with the blended luminosity class of a bright giant and a giant star. HD 57197 is estimated to be 220 million years old, enough time for it to expand to 3.9 times the Sun's radius. Based on its extinction in the Gaia passband, it has an iron abundance 66% that of the Sun. This makes HD 57197 metal deficent.

References

Puppis
B-type giants
Puppis, M
CD-43 3093
2789
057197
035347
B-type bright giants
Puppis, 85